American Taboo is a 1983 American independent drama film directed by Steve Lustgarten. Its plot follows a thirty-something year old photographer who begins an illicit romance with a teenage girl. It won the 1983 Academy Award for Best Student Film for Lustgarten, a film student at Portland State University.

Cast
 Jay Horenstein as Paul Wunderlich
 Nicole Harrison as Lisa Welch
 Hester Schell as Betsy
 Mark Rabiner as Michael

Production
The film was shot on location in Portland, Oregon on a budget of $20,000. The feature was a student film by Steve Lustgarten, a film student at Portland State University.

Release

Theatrical distribution
The film screened in Minneapolis in 1983 in the Film in the Cities' Gallery. It had a revival screening at the American Film Institute eight years later, in July 1991.

Critical response
Kevin Thomas of the Los Angeles Times wrote that the film "has a rich visual elegance. The portrayals Lustgarten elicits from Horenstein and Harrison are amazingly persuasive, especially in the case of Harrison, who keeps us guessing throughout as to whether Lisa really is as sophisticated as she would like us to think she is." LA Weekly also praised the film, noting that Lustgarten "tiptoes around every cliché attached to older-man/young-girl  and owl-and-pussycat types of films, creating a refreshing guide to bruised emotions and the insurgent power of love."

Accolades

References

External links

1983 films
American drama films
Films shot in Portland, Oregon
Juvenile sexuality in films
American student films
Student Academy Award winners
Films about pedophilia
1980s English-language films
1980s American films